Nugzari Tsurtsumia (born 25 February 1997) is a Georgian Greco-Roman wrestler who competes in the 55kg category.  After winning numerous medals at various international tournaments, Tsurtsumia became a world champion at the 2019 World Wrestling Championships in Nursultan, Kazakhstan.

References

Living people
1997 births
World Wrestling Championships medalists
Male sport wrestlers from Georgia (country)
European Wrestling Championships medalists
20th-century people from Georgia (country)
21st-century people from Georgia (country)
World Wrestling Champions